The 2014 Port Adelaide Football Club season marked the club's 18th season in the Australian Football League (AFL) and 132nd season in the South Australian National Football League (SANFL).

The 2014 season was the first to feature the club's newly adopted unified club structure, whereby the club’s AFL listed players were granted permission to play for the Port Adelaide reserves team in the SANFL, rather than be drafted to other SANFL clubs as in previous seasons.

The club's AFL team (seniors) is known as the Power, whilst it's SANFL team (reserves) is known as the Magpies.

Squad for 2014
Statistics are correct as of end of 2014 season.
Flags represent the state of origin, i.e. the state in which the player played his Under-18s football.

SANFL List:
Steven Summerton (Captain), Jake Johansen, Louis Sharrad, Angus Bruggemann
Ben Haren, Danny Butcher, Matt Venter, Nathan Krakouer, Ben Sawford, Henry Slattery
Sam Gordon, Anthony Biemans, Zac Hawkins, Robbie Young, Aseri Raikiwasa 
* These players are only eligible to play for the SANFL reserves team and not for the AFL senior team

Coaching Staff:
 Ken Hinkley (Head Coach)
 Josh Carr (Midfield)
 Tyson Edwards (Forwards)
 Shaun Hart (Senior Assistant)
 Garry Hocking (SANFL coach)
 Matthew Nicks (Defence)
 Phil Walsh (Midfield Management)
 Stuart Cochrane (Player Development)
 Aaron Greaves (Development/Ruck Coach)

Squad changes
 Ins 

 Outs

AFL season summary

Pre-season matches

Premiership season matches

Ladder

Finals series

SANFL season summary

Premiership season matches

Ladder

Finals series

Notable events
 wore a replica of its 2004 guernsey in Round 4 to commemorate its Grand Final victory over the Brisbane Lions from that year.
 Port Adelaide recorded the 44th SANFL minor premiership in club history, finishing the home and away season with 12 wins and 6 losses.

Club awards
 To be revealed in October/November 2014

Notes
 Key

 H ^ Home match.
 A ^ Away match.

 Notes
Port Adelaide's scores are indicated in bold font.

References

External links

Port Adelaide Football Club
Port Adelaide Football Club seasons